is a Japanese writer. She has won the R-18 Literary Award, the Yamamoto Shūgorō Prize, the Yamada Fūtarō Prize, and the Naoki Prize. Her work has been adapted for film and television, including the 2012 film The Cowards Who Looked to the Sky.

Early life and education 

Kubo was born in 1965 in Inagi, a city in western Tokyo. She attended Catholic schools through junior high and high school, then dropped out of junior college and worked part-time jobs before landing full-time work at an advertising company. After the birth of her child she became a freelance nonfiction writer and editor focusing particularly on women's health and medicine.

Career 

In 2009 Kubo's short story "Mikumari" won the R-18 Literary Award, a prize for erotic short fiction by new women writers. Her first book , a sexually explicit set of stories about the relationship between a woman seeking fertility treatments and the teenage son of the woman who runs the clinic, was published by Shinchosha in 2010. The next year Fugainai boku wa sora o mita won the 24th Yamamoto Shūgorō Prize. It was later adapted into the 2012 Yuki Tanada film The Cowards Who Looked to the Sky, starring Tomoko Tabata and Kento Nagayama.

Kubo's second book, a story about three people who travel to see a stranded whale, was published by Shinchosha in 2012. Seiten no mayoikujira won the 3rd Yamada Futarō Prize, which is awarded by Kadokawa Shoten to works in the same artistic spirit as those of mystery writer Futaro Yamada. Several books followed, including the linked story collection  in 2014, the 2015 novel , which dramatized an actual case of murder of a young girl by a teenage boy, the 2016 speculative fiction novel , which imagined Japan in 2030 after rising youth suicide rates and declining fertility, and the 2017 novel . 

An English version of Kubo's early short story "Mikumari", translated by Polly Barton, was published in 2017 by Strangers Press. The next year Kubo's novel , a story about relationships among nursing caregivers, was published by Gentosha. Jitto te o miru was nominated for the 159th Naoki Prize and led the voting among selection committee members in the first round, but the prize was awarded to Rio Shimamoto. The following year her story  was nominated for the 161st Naoki Prize. A Nippon TV adaptation of Yameru toki mo sukoyaka naru toki mo, starring Taisuke Fujigaya of the boy band Kis-My-Ft2, aired in early 2020. In 2022, Kubo was awarded the 167th Naoki Prize for her short story collection .

Recognition 
 2009: 8th R-18 Literary Prize
 2011: 24th Yamamoto Shūgorō Prize
 2012: 3rd Yamada Fūtarō Prize
 2022: 167th Naoki Prize

Selected works

In Japanese 
 , Shinchosha, 2010,  (includes "Mikumari")
 , Shinchosha, 2012, 
 , Shinchosha, 2014, 
 , Bungeishunjū, 2015, 
 , Kawade Shobō Shinsha, 2016, 
 , Shueisha, 2017, 
 , Gentosha, 2018, 
 , Bungeishunjū, 2022,

In English 
 "From the Left Bank of the Flu", trans. Polly Barton, Granta, 2017
 Mikumari, trans. Polly Barton, Strangers Press, 2017, 
So We Look to the Sky, trans. Polly Barton, Arcade Publishing, 2021

References

1965 births
Living people
21st-century Japanese novelists
21st-century Japanese women writers
Japanese women novelists
People from Inagi, Tokyo
Naoki Prize winners
Writers from Tokyo